Indha Nilai Maarum is a 2020 Tamil-language thriller film directed by Arunkanth V in his directorial debut. The film features Ashwin Kumar, Ramkumar and Nivedhithaa Sathish in the lead roles.

Cast 
 Ashwin Kumar as Surya
 Ramkumar as Deva
 Nivedhithaa Sathish 
 Chaams as RJ Jack, who dresses like Michael Jackson
 T. M. Karthik as the general manager of a publishing company
 Y. G. Mahendra 
 Lakshmy Ramakrishnan
 Delhi Ganesh
 Santhana Bharathi
 Pandu
 Sarah George
 Vinod Varma

Production 
The film began production in 2017 with Ramkumar, Ashwin Kumar Lakshmikanthan, and Nivedhithaa Sathish in the lead roles. Y. G. Mahendra was reported to be playing the villain with Lakshmy Ramakrishnan as his female aid. The film is set in an IT company.

Soundtrack
Songs for the film were composed by Arunkanth V.
Indha Nilai Maarum - Suchith Suresan, Trilok MC
Kadhal Thevai - Suchith Suresan, Trilok MC
Hey Sweety - Suchith Suresan, Vaishali
Aint Going Down - Trilok MC
Tribute To Tamanna - Roshan Sebastian

Release 
The film premiered on 6 March 2020. 

Indha Nilai Maarum received negative reviews. The Times of India gave the film one out of five stars and stated that "The film is unappealing in every ways, and the terrible part is, the sequences appear like a poorly staged drama." Film Companion wrote "Like his first film Goko Mako, Indha Nilai Maarum too exists in a peculiar space where it keeps achieving bursts of “so-bad-its-so-good” glory, but even the awfulness is inconsistent." Maalaimalar praised the intent of the film. Dina Thanthi praised the direction, cinematography, and background music.

References

External links 
 

2020 films
Indian thriller films
2020s Tamil-language films
2020 directorial debut films
2020 thriller films